The men's mass start speed skating competition of the 2018 Winter Olympics was held on 24 February 2018 at Gangneung Oval in Gangneung This was the first time the mass start has been introduced to the Olympics.  The competition was held as a points race.

Format 
There were 12 skaters in each semifinal. The eight best finishers from each of two semi-finals competed in the final. Each race consisted of 16 laps. Three leaders after last 16th lap received 60, 40 and 20 points respectively. Three intermediate sprints award points to the first three competitors (5 points, 3 points, 1 point) after 4th, 8th and 12th laps. Event rankings were based on points gained in sprints, then by finish time for athletes with equal points. In the Gangneung Oval, the accurate distance of 16 laps of the warm-up lane, is 5,695.175 m (355.948 m each lap).

Results 
All races were skated on the same day, 24 February 2018. The first semifinal was held at 20:45, the second at 21:00. The final was on the same day at 22:00.

Semifinals

Final

References 

Men's speed skating at the 2018 Winter Olympics